"Andres" is a song by the American all-female rock group L7. It was released as a single in support of their fourth album Hungry for Stink.  The song is an apology to a friend of the band, Andres, who was hurt by someone they introduced him to.

In popular culture
On October 13, 2009, the song was made available as a downloadable song in the Rock Band digital store.

Track listing

Personnel
Adapted from the Andres liner notes.

L7
 Jennifer Finch – bass guitar
 Suzi Gardner – lead vocals, electric guitar
 Demetra Plakas – drums
 Donita Sparks – electric guitar, cover art

Production and additional personnel
 Michael Barbiero – mixing
 GGGarth – production, recording
 L7 – production
 George Marino – mastering

Charts

Release history

References

External links 
 

1994 songs
1994 singles
L7 (band) songs
Song recordings produced by Garth Richardson
Songs written by Suzi Gardner
Songs written by Donita Sparks
Slash Records singles
Songs against capitalism